George F. Shipp was an American football coach.  He served as the seventh head football coach at the University of Arizona, coaching for two seasons, 1910 and 1911, and compiling a record of 8–1–1.

Head coaching record

References

Year of birth missing
Year of death missing
Arizona Wildcats football coaches